L'Hospitalet-près-l'Andorre (literally L'Hospitalet near the Andorra) is a commune in the Ariège department of southwestern France. L'Hospitalet-près-l'Andorre literally translates to "The Hospital Near Andorra".

The area has a history of vulnerability to winter avalanches: one such in 1895 killed 12 (nearly 10% of the commune's population at the time), and much destruction was also caused in 1906 and 1929. Avalanches have from time to time blocked the N20, the main road through the commune, the most recent case being in 2008.

Transport
The Andorre-L'Hospitalet station – served by TER Occitanie regional trains between Toulouse and Latour-de-Carol and the overnight Intercités de nuit service between Paris and Latour-de-Carol – is an important international transport node for the nearby principality of Andorra, to which the station is connected by a bus link.

Local government
The village has a Mairie from which local government is organised. There is an elected mayor. The office is currently held by Arnaud Diaz.

Community facilities
There is a hotel in the village centre, the Hôtel du Puymorens, which has both a bar and a restaurant open to non-residents, and available to local residents. There is also a small guest house in the main street, operated as part of the French Gîtes system, with a small shop for essential supplies. There are few businesses trading in the village, although there is a small engineering company. There is a primary school, whose buildings include a residential youth centre for visiting groups. A school bus visits L'Hospitalet daily to transport older children to secondary school.

Religion
Roman Catholicism is the only organised religion in the community. There is a parish church, with churchyard, in the main street. Although the village has no resident priest, services are held regularly.

Population

See also
Communes of the Ariège department
Andorre-L'Hospitalet station

References

External links
 L'Hospitalet-près-l'Andorre on French IGN mapping portal
 L'Hospitalet-près-l'Andorre Official Village website
 Trophée de l’Isard race page

Communes of Ariège (department)
Ariège communes articles needing translation from French Wikipedia